This is a list of buildings that are examples of Art Deco:
 List of Art Deco architecture in Africa
 List of Art Deco architecture in Asia
 List of Art Deco architecture in Europe
 List of Art Deco architecture in the Americas
 List of Art Deco architecture in the United States
 List of Art Deco architecture in Oceania

See also 

 Art Deco topics
 Streamline Moderne architecture

 
Art Deco